Jennifer DeLora (born March 2, 1962) is an American model, actress, and educator. She began her career as a beauty queen, and was crowned Miss Ulster County in her youth. She later established herself as an actress in B movies in the 1980s and 1990s, with roles in Robot Holocaust (1987), Young Nurses in Love (1987), Frankenhooker (1990), and Suburban Commando (1991). She frequently appeared in mainstream films for director Chuck Vincent.

Career
DeLora's film credits include minor roles in Soup for One (1982) and Robot Holocaust (1987), as well as the horror films Frankenhooker and Deadly Manor (both 1990). DeLora was crowned Miss Ulster County in 1986, but had the title revoked when it was discovered she had appeared nude on film.

DeLora, who is fluent in American Sign Language (ASL), taught the language to Ann-Margret in preparation for her role in Blue Rodeo (1996).

DeLora subsequently earned a PhD in psychology, and has taught American Sign Language at New York University.

In 2016, she starred in the music video for "LA Devotee" by Panic! at the Disco.

Filmography

Film

Music videos

References

External links

1962 births
Actresses from New York (state)
American beauty pageant contestants
Antioch University alumni
New York University faculty
People from Kingston, New York
Living people
American women academics
21st-century American women